The Alfred Beit Road Bridge is a road bridge crossing the Limpopo River between Musina in South Africa and Beitbridge in Zimbabwe.

History
The original Alfred Beit Bridge, which now only carries rail traffic, was completed in 1929 by Dorman Long. Named after Alfred Beit, the gold and diamond magnate, it cost $600,000 and was opened by the Earl of Athlone on 31 August 1929.

The new road bridge, constructed in 1995 parallel to the old bridge, accommodates far heavier traffic than the old bridge could take. It was built by Murray & Roberts on behalf of New Limpopo Bridge Ltd who now operate the bridge.

References

Bridges in South Africa
Bridges in Zimbabwe
Bridges completed in 1995
Build–operate–transfer
South Africa–Zimbabwe border crossings
Bridges completed in 1929
Toll bridges
International bridges
Buildings and structures in Matabeleland South Province
1929 establishments in the British Empire